Fjellvatnet is a lake that is located in Nordland county, Norway.  The  lake lies mostly in Bindal Municipality, but the far eastern part of the lake extends into the neighboring Brønnøy Municipality where it is known as Storvatnet.  It flows out through a channel on the southwestern side of the lake and flows into the neighboring lake Eidevatnet.

See also
 List of lakes in Norway
 Geography of Norway

References

Lakes of Nordland
Bindal